The Eastmain Reservoir is a reservoir which lies about 800 kilometres north of Montreal. The reservoir is part of a project known as the Eastmain-1-A/Sarcelle/Rupert Project which is designed to increase hydroelectric power for the Canadian province. Some of the structures along this reservoir include the Eastmain-1 power house and the Eastmain-1-A power house, which are under construction. Eastmain-1 has three water turbines that can collectively generate as much as 480 megawatt hours of electricity, according to the EM-1 Project plan. Meanwhile, HydroQuébec explains that Eastmain-1-A is intended to supplement its slightly older neighbor. When complete, Eastmain-1-A is expected to generate up to 768 megawatts.

References

Reservoirs in Quebec